Troféu Osmar Santos is an award given by the Brazilian newspaper Lance! to the winner of the first turn of the Série A. The trophy honors Osmar Santos, who is a former sports commentator. The award was created in 2004.

Winners

Titles by team

See also
 Troféu João Saldanha

References

Campeonato Brasileiro Série A trophies and awards
Lance!